Clyde Petersen is an artist based in Seattle, working in film, animation, music, and installation. As a director he is most renowned for Torrey Pines (2016), an autobiographical stop-motion animated feature film, which toured the world with a live score.

He is the founding member of punk band Your Heart Breaks. Between 2012 and 2015, he hosted the web series Boating with Clyde, set on a small handmade boat in the Washington Park Arboretum. Petersen is transgender and his art often explores queer themes.

Career
In 1998, whilst living in Bellingham, Washington and studying documentary film production at Western Washington University, Petersen started the band Your Heart Breaks. The band has released multiple albums, either by self-releasing or through small independent labels, throughout the 2000s and 2010s.

While working at a post-production house in Seattle Petersen gained experience working with animation on some commercials.

Petersen has directed music videos (some of which were animated) for artists including the Thermals, Laura Veirs, Deerhoof, and Thao & the Get Down Stay Down.

In October 2016, Petersen released Torrey Pines, a film he had written, directed, and animated over the previous three years. The soundtrack for which was recorded by Chris Walla and features members of Your Heart Breaks as well as several other collaborators. The film was toured worldwide with a live score for the next two years.

In early 2018, Petersen announced he is working on a documentary about the American drone metal band Earth.

Petersen's art installation work often uses cardboard and paper as medium, akin to his stop-motion animations. From late 2018 to spring 2019, he had an exhibition entitled Merch and Destroy at the Bellevue Arts Museum in Washington that’s a larger-than-life rock band's touring van in the process of unloading.

Filmography

References

Living people
1980 births
People from Seattle
Seattle
Musicians from Seattle
20th-century American singers
21st-century American singers
Film producers from Washington (state)
Filmmakers from Seattle
American filmmakers
American LGBT musicians
American lyricists
LGBT people from Washington (state)
Transgender singers
LGBT film directors
21st-century LGBT people